The 1974 Croydon Council election took place on 2 May 1974 to elect members of Croydon London Borough Council in London, England. The whole council was up for election and the Conservative party stayed in overall control of the council.

Background

Election result

Ward results

Addiscombe

Bensham Manor

Broad Green

Central

Coulsdon East

East

New Addington

Norbury

Purley

Sanderstead & Selsdon

Sanderstead North

Shirley

South Norwood

Thornton Heath

Upper Norwood

Waddon

West Thornton

Whitehorse Manor

Woodcote & Coulsdon West

Woodside

References

1974
1974 London Borough council elections